Rank comparison chart of enlisted for all air forces of Post-Soviet states.

Enlisted (OR 1–9)

References

See also
Comparative air force enlisted ranks of Asia
Comparative air force enlisted ranks of Europe

Military comparisons